Robert Carradine (born March 24, 1954) is an American actor. A member of the Carradine family, he made his first appearances on television Western series such as Bonanza and his brother David's TV series, Kung Fu. Carradine's first film role was in the 1972 film The Cowboys, which starred John Wayne and Roscoe Lee Browne. Carradine also portrayed fraternity president Lewis Skolnick in the Revenge of the Nerds series of comedy films.

Early life
Carradine is the son of actress and artist Sonia Sorel (née Henius) and actor John Carradine. He is one of many actors in the Carradine family. He is the brother of Christopher and Keith Carradine, paternal half-brother of Bruce and the late David Carradine, and maternal half-brother of Michael Bowen. His maternal great-grandfather was biochemist Max Henius, and his maternal great-grandmother was the sister of historian Johan Ludvig Heiberg.

Carradine's parents divorced when he was 2 years old. A bitter custody battle led to his father gaining custody of him and his brothers, Christopher and Keith. During the custody battle, the children spent three months in a home for abused children as wards of the court. His brother, Keith, said of the experience, "It was like being in jail. There were bars on the windows, and we were only allowed to see our parents through glass doors.  It was very sad. We would stand there on either side of the glass door crying".

Carradine was raised primarily by his stepmother, his father's third wife, Doris Grimshaw, and believed her to be his mother until he was introduced to Sonia Sorel at a Christmas party when he was 14 years old. While still in high school, Robert lived with his half-brother, David, in Laurel Canyon, California. Under David's care he indulged in two of his major interests: race car driving and music.  He and David belonged to a musical quartet that performed in small clubs in Los Angeles and San Francisco.

Acting career

Film
Carradine made his film debut in 1972 in The Cowboys with John Wayne. He was also featured in a short-lived television series, of the same name, based on the movie. He made an appearance as a killer in the Martin Scorsese film Mean Streets shooting to death the character played by his brother, David.

During this time he worked with David on some independent projects including a biker film called You and Me  (1975) and an unreleased musical called A Country Mile.  He also did camera work for David's cult classic Vietnam War-inspired Americana which was not released until 1983.

In 1976, Carradine had the opportunity to demonstrate on screen what he considered to be his "first ambition", car racing, when he played Jim Cantrell in Paul Bartel's Cannonball. In the film Robert's character wins the cross country road race, beating the favorite, Coy "Cannonball" Buckman, played by his brother, David. In 1977, Robert became a snack for the vengeful killer whale in the Jaws imitation film Orca.

Robert also played with other Hollywood offspring in the 1977 film "Joyride", where he starred with Desi Arnaz, Jr., Melanie Griffith and Anne Lockhart (daughter of June Lockhart) in a film about young Californians driving up to Washington and Alaska to seek their fortunes.  

In 1978, Robert landed a demanding role in Hal Ashby's Oscar-winning Vietnam War drama, Coming Home, which starred Jane Fonda and Jon Voight. His performance caused some speculation that he might be the best actor in his family.

Robert was instrumental in securing his brothers David and Keith to perform with him in one of the most unusual casting arrangements in movie history. Together the Carradines played the Younger brothers in The Long Riders (1980) along with three other sets of acting brothers: Stacy and James Keach, Dennis and Randy Quaid, and Christopher and Nicholas Guest.

Also in 1980, Carradine co-starred with Mark Hamill and Lee Marvin in Samuel Fuller's The Big Red One recounting Fuller's World War II experience. His character, who was based on Fuller himself, narrated the film.

In 1983, he and Cherie Curie starred in the science fiction movie Wavelength in which he played a washed up rock star who helps extraterrestrials escape from a military base. For the film he performed his own compositions including one named after his daughter, Ever. Also in 1983, he starred in the music video for The Motels hit song "Suddenly Last Summer" as lead singer Martha Davis' love interest.

Carradine's biggest film success to date came in 1984 when he starred in Revenge of the Nerds as the lead nerd Lewis Skolnick.  To prepare for the comedy, Carradine spent time at The University of Arizona, where the movie was filmed, participating in rush week.  "No fraternity picked him, convincing Carradine that he was indeed right for the part of the nerd that nobody wanted to claim as their own." Carradine reprised the role of Skolnick in three sequels, taking over as executive producer in the latter two. In 2018, Carradine joined Andrew Cassese and Don Gibb in an interview at the Niagara Falls Comic Con. In 2001, he played Donald Keeble in Max Keeble's Big Move. In 2000 he co-starred with Caroline Rhea in Mom's Got a Date with a Vampire. He reprised his role as Sam McGuire in The Lizzie McGuire Movie in 2003.

Television
Carradine's first television appearance was in 1971, on the classic Western series Bonanza. He also appeared on his brother David's series Kung Fu as Sunny Jim, the mute companion of Serenity Johnson, played by his father John Carradine, in an episode titled Dark Angel (1972). In 1979, he was alongside Melissa Sue Anderson in Survival of Dana.  In 1984, Carradine played Robert Cohn in the television mini-series version of Ernest Hemingway's The Sun Also Rises. He appeared in the 1987 HBO mini-series Conspiracy: The Trial of the Chicago 8. He was also a guest star in an episode of Law & Order: Criminal Intent titled Gone (2005, Season 4, Episode 11), portraying a character based very loosely on Bobby Fischer. He also appeared in Jane Doe, a TV series directed by James A. Contner, in 2007.

He played father Sam McGuire on Lizzie McGuire from 2001 to 2004. The show starred Hilary Duff as Lizzie and was widely popular among girls. The show's realistic approach to the problems of a 13-year-old girl also appealed to parents.

He appeared in the ER episode "Sleepless in Chicago" alongside Nerds co-star Anthony Edwards.

In January 2013, he and former Revenge of the Nerds co-star Curtis Armstrong hosted King of the Nerds on TBS, a reality TV series in which a group of nerds compete to find out which one is the nerdiest.

In 2015, he appeared on a fourth season episode of Celebrity Wife Swap with Hall of Fame wide receiver Terrell Owens.

Personal life
Carradine has two daughters, actress Ever Carradine (with Susan Snyder), Marika Reed Carradine with his ex-wife Edie Mani, and a son, Ian Alexander Carradine. He is also the uncle (via his older brother Keith) of actress Martha Plimpton.

Carradine participated in the Rolex 24 race at Daytona in 2000, finishing 29th in the GTU class and 61st overall.

Filmography

Film

Television

Awards and nominations

References

External links
 
 
 
 
 
 Robert Carradine Producer Profile for The 1 Second Film

1954 births
20th-century American male actors
21st-century American male actors
American male film actors
American male television actors
Carradine family
Living people
Male actors from Hollywood, Los Angeles
Racing drivers from California
Racing drivers from Los Angeles